This is a list of episodes for Season 13 of Late Night with Conan O'Brien, which aired from September 6, 2005, to September 15, 2006.

Series overview

Season 13

References

Episodes (season 13)